Long Tanid (also known as Long Tanla) is a settlement in the Lawas division of Sarawak, Malaysia. 
It is about 3 hours drive from Lawas just before entering Ba'kelalan.

Geography
Neighbouring settlements include:

References

Populated places in Sarawak